The 2016 North Tyneside Metropolitan Borough Council election took place on 5 May 2016 to elect members of North Tyneside Metropolitan Borough Council in England. This was on the same day as other local elections.

All of the seats being contested were last contested in 2012, and these results are compared to the  results of 2015.

Result

Council Composition
Prior to the election the composition of the council was:

After the election the composition of the council was:

Candidates by party

There are a total of 67 candidates standing across the 20 seats - an average of 3.35 in each ward. The Labour Party and  Conservative Party are both fielding a full slate of 20 candidates. The United Kingdom Independence Party are fielding 16 candidates. There are 4 candidates representing the Liberal Democrats and 3 representing the Trade Unionist and Socialist Coalition and standing as Independent candidates respectively. 1 candidate is representing the Green Party.

Since the last local election in 2015, the number of candidates representing Labour, the Conservatives, and the TUSC was unchanged. Independent candidates increased by 3, the Liberal Democrats had an increase of 1 candidate, and the Green Party and United Kingdom Independence Party both had a decrease of 4 candidates.

Results by ward

Battle Hill

Benton

Camperdown

Chirton

Collingwood

Cullercoats

Howdon

Killingworth

Longbenton

Monkseaton North

Monkseaton South

Northumberland

Preston

Riverside

St. Mary's

Tynemouth

Valley

Wallsend

Weetslade

Whitley Bay

References

2016 English local elections
2016
21st century in Tyne and Wear